Recarei is a town in the Porto district of Portugal which forms part of the municipality of Paredes. It has the administrative status of a freguesia or parish.

References

Freguesias of Paredes, Portugal